Javier Jiménez Báez (born 1 August 1952 in Alajuela) is a retired Costa Rican football player.

Club career
Nicknamed el Zurdo, Jiménez played 12 years for Alajuelense, making his senior debut in 1972. In 1978, he had a 4-month spell at  Guanacasteca and in 1982 he had a stint abroad with Honduran side Real España. He returned to Costa Rica to play in the second division with El Carmen de Alajuela, then had another season at Alajuelense before retiring with Curridabat in 1985. He scored 120 goals in the Costa Rican leagues, 73 of them for Liga for whom he totalled 293 league matches.

International career
Jiménez was capped by Costa Rica, playing 30 games and scoring 8 goals. He represented his country in 9 FIFA World Cup qualification matches. He scored a hattrick in an Olympic Games qualifier against Suriname in March 1980. Jiménez played for Costa Rica at the 1975 Pan American Games.

His final international was an October 1980 FIFA World Cup qualification match against Honduras.

Personal life
After retiring, Jiménez worked in fashion trade. He has three children.
One named Joshua Jiménez

References

External links
 Profile - Alajuelense 

1952 births
Living people
People from Alajuela
Association football wingers
Costa Rican footballers
Costa Rica international footballers
Pan American Games competitors for Costa Rica
Footballers at the 1975 Pan American Games
L.D. Alajuelense footballers
Real C.D. España players
Costa Rican expatriate footballers
Expatriate footballers in Honduras
Costa Rican expatriate sportspeople in Honduras
Liga FPD players